Prospero Colonna may refer to several members of the Colonna family:
Prospero I Colonna (c. 1410–1463), Italian Roman Catholic cardinal
Prospero II Colonna (1662–1743), Italian Roman Catholic cardinal
Prospero Colonna (condottiero) (1452–1523)
Prospero Colonna di Sciarra (1707–1765)
Prospero Colonna di Paliano, mayor of Rome in 1899–1904